Herbert Ball Crosby (December 24, 1871 – January 11, 1936) was a career officer in the United States Army. A veteran of the Spanish–American War and World War I, he attained the rank of major general as the Army's Chief of Cavalry.

Born in Kansas and raised in Kansas and Illinois, Crosby graduated from West Point in 1893 and was commissioned as a second lieutenant of Cavalry. He served throughout the western United States at the start of his career, and served in Cuba during the Spanish–American War. As his career progressed, Crosby served in the Philippines during the Philippine–American War and in Arizona during the Mexican Border Campaign. During World War I, Crosby commanded the 351st Infantry Regiment, a unit of the 88th Division, and served on several occasions as acting commander of the division's 176th Infantry Brigade.

After the war, Crosby graduated from the Army's School of the Line, Command and General Staff College, and Army War College; he was an instructor at the Staff College after his graduation, and after he graduated from the War College he served as its deputy commandant. In 1926, Crosby was appointed as the Army's Chief of Cavalry, and he served until retiring in 1930.

From 1930 to 1933, Crosby was one of the three federal commissioners responsible for administering the government of Washington, DC.  He died in Washington in 1936, and was buried at Arlington National Cemetery.

Early life
Herbert Ball Crosby was born in Fairmount, Kansas on December 24, 1871, the son of George Heman and Jane (Ball) Crosby. He was raised and educated in Leavenworth, Kansas and Chicago, Illinois, and graduated from the United States Military Academy in 1893. Crosby was commissioned as a second lieutenant of Cavalry, and assigned to the 8th Cavalry Regiment.

Start of career
Crosby served with 8th Cavalry Regiment from 1893 to 1901, including postings to Fort Meade (South Dakota), Fort Yates (North Dakota), Fort Assinniboine (Montana) (including service as post commander), and Huntsville, Alabama. During the Spanish–American War he served with his regiment at Puerto Principe, Cuba.

In 1901, Crosby was promoted to captain and assigned to the 14th Cavalry Regiment. His assignments included command of Troop B and regimental commissary, and he served at Fort Riley (Kansas), Fort Huachuca (Arizona), the Philippines, Fort Walla Walla (Washington), and Boise Barracks (Idaho). From 1909 to 1911 he performed recruiting duty at Fort Slocum, New York, and from 1912 to 1915, Crosby served in the Philippines with the 8th Cavalry. In 1915 he was assigned to the 1st Cavalry Regiment, and he served at the Presidio of San Francisco and the Presidio of Monterey, and then at Fort Naco, Arizona as part of the Mexican Border Campaign. He was promoted to major in 1916.

World War I

Crosby was promoted to temporary lieutenant colonel in June 1917, and temporary colonel the following August. From 1917 to 1919 he commanded the 351st Infantry Regiment, a unit of 176th Infantry Brigade, 88th Division. The regiment was composed of soldiers from Minnesota and Iowa, and Crosby commanded it from its organization at Camp Dodge, Iowa through its combat in France. He also acted as commander of the 176th Infantry Brigade from April to May and July to September 1918, in January 1919, and from April to May 1919.

Post-World War I
In 1919, Crosby reverted to his permanent rank of lieutenant colonel. He attended the School of the Line as a student from 1919 to 1920, and was promoted to permanent colonel in 1920. From 1920 to 1921 he was a student at the Command and General Staff College, and he remained there as an instructor following his graduation. He was a student at the Army War College from 1922 to 1923, and he remained at the War College as assistant commandant until 1926.

Chief of Cavalry
Crosby was appointed as Chief of Cavalry in 1926, succeeding Malin Craig, and was promoted to major general. He served until 1930, and his tenure was notable for his advocacy of modernization. Unlike many traditional Cavalry members, who continued to promote the use of horses for cavalry, Crosby pushed for experimentation and exercises that included airplanes and tanks as part of the Army's Cavalry divisions. Crosby retired in 1930 and was succeeded by Guy V. Henry Jr.

Later career
From 1930 to 1933, Crosby was one of the three federal commissioners responsible for administering the government of Washington, DC.

Death and burial
Crosby died in Washington, DC on January 11, 1936. He was buried at Arlington National Cemetery, Section 6, Site 5013.

Family
In 1902, Crosby married Catharine Adelaide Dakin of Evanston, Illinois. They were the parents of four children—George Dakin, Richard Lansing, Jane, and Gordon Willard.

References

Sources

Books

Newspapers

External sources
 
 

1871 births
1936 deaths
United States Army Cavalry Branch personnel
People from Leavenworth, Kansas
Military personnel from Kansas
United States Military Academy alumni
United States Army Command and General Staff College alumni
United States Army War College alumni
United States Army generals
Burials at Arlington National Cemetery
United States Army personnel of World War I